K. Laldawngliana is an Indian politician who is serving as Member of Mizoram Legislative Assembly from Tuirial Assembly constituency.

Personal life 
He was born in 16 September 1972.

References 

Mizoram MLAs 2018–2023

1972 births
Living people